Dr. Ong Kian Ming (born 12 September 1975), is a Malaysian politician from the Democratic Action Party (DAP), a component party of the Pakatan Harapan (PH) opposition coalition. He served as the Member of Parliament (MP) for Bangi from May 2018 to November 2022 and Serdang from May 2013 to May 2018 and the Deputy Minister of International Trade and Industry in the PH administration under former Prime Minister Mahathir Mohamad and former Minister Darell Leiking from July 2018 to the collapse of the PH administration in February 2020.

Ong was formerly an academic and a prominent political analyst in the Malaysian political scene before he turned Election Strategist for the DAP.  His articles were widely published in popular news portals such as Malaysiakini, Malaysian Insider and The Edge. Prior to that he was a lecturer in Faculty of Economics and Policy Science, UCSI University, also a regional consultant for the Blue Ocean Strategy regional center. His experience includes being a policy analyst for Socio Economics Development and Research Institute (SEDAR) and Institute of Strategic Analysis and Policy Research (INSAP). In addition, he was also associate consultant for the Boston Consulting Group Kuala Lumpur.

Personal life
Ong has an elder brother and a younger sister. He grew up in Petaling Jaya. His father was an architect. He married Yeoh Ee Leng in 2004. The couple do not have any children. He is known for his passion for running, and features regularly in local running events. He believes that academic credentials is not necessarily needed to ensure one's success rather, what is more important is a person's integrity.

Education
Ong, a Fulbright scholar, is a PhD holder in political science from Duke University, USA. He also has a master's degree in economics from Cambridge University and a degree in economics from London School of Economics. Prior to that he was an ASEAN scholar who completed his "O" and "A" levels in Raffles Institution and Raffles Junior College in Singapore respectively.

Deputy Minister of International Trade and Industry
During his tenure as Deputy Minister of MITI, he is known for his ability to articulate without having any speech text. He is also known for his informal approach during the events which he attends. His approachability as well as intellect, backed by his credentials drew support from a number of groups in which he interacted with, particularly among academicians and intellectuals.

In an interview session by The Malaysian Insight, Ong admitted that he never intended to get involved in politics. He also believes he is very fortunate to be in MITI, as it is one of the key ministries which is widely acknowledge for being very proactive, business friendly and outward looking. He further acknowledged the contribution and influence of former Minister of MITI, Tan Sri Rafidah Aziz in cultivating a culture of responsiveness and accountability in the ministry.

In April 2019, he criticized a senior UBS official who made misleading comments about Malaysia's economy. He argued that he would normally accept any criticisms thrown to the government, provided that they are factually correct. He pointed out how the UBS official, Kelvin Tay, from UBS Wealth Management misinterpreted certain economic figures, particularly on the difference between current account deficit and fiscal deficit, as well as Tay's statement on Malaysia's over-reliance on the oil & gas industry. UBS later that month conceded and acknowledged that Tay did make some erroneous statements and painted a wrong picture on the state of the Malaysian economy.

Ong has been a supporter for the development of electrical & electronics (E&E) industry in Malaysia and has written extensively on his blog regarding the development of the industry. He is also actively involved in the startup scene in Malaysia, evident through his comments as well as him attending several events related to technology and start ups.

In addition to this, Ong has also been a very strong advocate on the adoption of Industry 4.0-related processes into Malaysian industries. He has been aggressively promoting the use and integration of technologies related to Industry 4.0 (IR 4.0). Edwin Yapp, an author from Digital News Asia featured Ong's advocacy on Industry 4.0 as one of his five favorite things for 2019.

Malaysia Electoral Roll Analysis Project
Ong pioneered the Malaysian Electoral Roll Analysis Project (MERAP) and is the director for the project. He has published many of his findings on various news portal as well as discussed it with the Election Commission of Malaysia.

Election results

References

1975 births
Living people
Malaysian politicians of Chinese descent
Democratic Action Party (Malaysia) politicians
Members of the Dewan Rakyat
Alumni of the University of Cambridge
Duke University alumni
Alumni of the London School of Economics
Raffles Junior College alumni
Raffles Institution alumni
21st-century Malaysian politicians